A Per-Arnt-Sim (PAS) domain is a protein domain found in all kingdoms of life. Generally, the PAS domain acts as a molecular sensor, whereby small molecules and other proteins associate via binding of the PAS domain. Due to this sensing capability, the PAS domain has been shown as the key structural motif involved in protein-protein interactions of the circadian clock, and it is also a common motif found in signaling proteins, where it functions as a signaling sensor.

Discovery 

PAS domains are found in a large number of organisms from bacteria to mammals. The PAS domain was named after the three proteins in which it was first discovered:

 Per – period circadian protein
 Arnt – aryl hydrocarbon receptor nuclear translocator protein
 Sim – single-minded protein

Since the initial discovery of the PAS domain, a large quantity of PAS domain binding sites have been discovered in bacteria and eukaryotes.  A subset called PAS LOV proteins are responsive to oxygen, light and voltage.

Structure 

Although the PAS domain exhibits a degree of sequence variability, the three-dimensional structure of the PAS domain core is broadly conserved. This core consists of a five-stranded antiparallel β-sheet and several α-helices. Structural changes, as a result of signaling, predominantly originate within the β-sheet. These signals propagate via the α-helices of the core to the covalently-attached effector domain. In 1998, the PAS domain core architecture was first characterized in the structure of photoactive yellow protein (PYP) from Halorhodospira halophila. In many proteins, a dimer of PAS domains is required, whereby one binds a ligand and the other mediates interactions with other proteins.

Examples of PAS in organisms 

The PAS domains that are known share less than 20% average pairwise sequence identity, meaning they are surprisingly dissimilar. PAS domains are frequently found on proteins with other environmental sensing mechanisms.  Also, many PAS domains are attached to photoreceptive cells.

Bacteria 

Often in the bacterial kingdom, PAS domains are positioned at the amino terminus of signaling proteins such as sensor histidine kinases, cyclic-di-GMP synthases and hydrolases, and methyl-accepting chemotaxis proteins.

Neurospora 

In the presence of light, White Collar-1 (WC-1) and White Collar-2 (WC-2) dimerizes via mediation by the PAS domains, which activates translation of FRQ.

Drosophila 

In the presence of light, CLK and CYC attach via a PAS domain, activating the translation of PER, which then associates to Tim via the PER PAS domain. 
The following genes contain PAS binding domains: PER, Tim, CLK, CYC.

Arabidopsis 

A PAS domain is found in the ZTL and NPH1 genes. These domains are very similar to the PAS domain found in the Neurospora circadian-associated protein WC-1.

Mammals 

The circadian clock that is currently understood for mammals begins when light activates BMAL1 and CLK  to bind via their PAS domains.  That activator complex regulates Per1, Per2, and Per3 which all have PAS domains that are used to bind to cryptochromes 1 and 2 (CRY 1,2  family). The following mammalian genes contain PAS binding domains: Per1, Per2, Per3, Cry1, Cry2, Bmal, Clk, Pasd1.

Other mammalian PAS roles 

Within Mammals, both PAS domains play important roles. PAS A is responsible for the protein-protein interactions with other PAS domain proteins, while PAS B has a more versatile role.  It mediates interactions with chaperonins and other small molecules like dioxin, but PAS B domains in NPAS2, a homolog of the Drosophila clk gene,  and the hypoxia inducible factor (HIF) also help to mediate ligand binding. Furthermore, PAS domains containing the NPAS2 protein have been shown to be a substitute for the Clock gene in mutant mice who lack the Clock gene completely.

The PAS domain also directly interacts with BHLH.  It is typically located on the C-Terminus of the BHLH protein.  PAS domains containing BHLH proteins form a BHLH-Pas protein, typically found and encoded in HIF, which require both the PAS domain and BHLH domain and the Clock gene.

References